The Managua skink (Mesoscincus managuae) is an extant species of skink, a lizard in the family Scincidae. The species is found in Costa Rica, Nicaragua, Honduras, El Salvador, and Guatemala.

References

Mesoscincus
Reptiles described in 1933
Taxa named by Emmett Reid Dunn